Legislative Sejm was the first national parliament (Sejm) of the newly created Polish People's Republic. It was elected in the 1947 Polish legislative election, the first since World War II. The first Legislative Sejm was formed in the aftermath of World War I on the territories of the newly formed Second Polish Republic.

History 
On February 5, 1947, the Sejm elected Bolesław Bierut as President of the Republic of Poland. On July 22, 1952, the Sejm passed the Constitution of the Polish People's Republic. It made the communist-led Sejm "the highest organ of State authority".  Despite this, the real source of power was the Polish United Workers' Party (PZPR) and its Central Committee, which was not regulated by the constitution but rather its own statute.

Composition 
The composition of the Legislative Sejm was as follows:

 Marshal: Władysław Kowalski
 Democratic Bloc: 394 seats;
 PSL: 28
 Labor Party: 12
 PSL "New Liberation": 7
 others: 3

References 

1947 establishments in Poland
1952 disestablishments in Poland
Sejm
Polish People's Republic